Rosenberg Glacier is a steep, heavily crevassed glacier draining the west slopes of the Ames Range between Mount Kosciusko and Mount Boennighausen, in Marie Byrd Land. Mapped by United States Geological Survey (USGS) from surveys and U.S. Navy air photos, 1959–65. Named by Advisory Committee on Antarctic Names (US-ACAN) for Theodore J. Rosenberg, ionospheric physicist at Siple Station, 1970–71.

References

 

Glaciers of Marie Byrd Land
Ames Range